Irish College in Toulouse(1618-1793), was a seminary like other Irish Colleges in Continental Europe set up to train priests during the Penal Laws prevented the training of priests in Ireland. Established in 1618 and given royal assent as 'le séminaire royal de Sainte Anne' in 1659, and in 1660 was formally linked to the University of Toulouse. As it was in his Diocese, the College was under the jurisdiction of the Archbishop of Toulouse, who visited the college in 1669, on accounts of bad behaviour by the students. The Irish College in Toulouse, was a setup sister college of the Irish College in Bordeaux to the pressure of numbers, like Bordeaux it was also supported by Anne of Austria, it followed the Bordeaux statues until it was constituted with its own statues. 
It only obtained its own fully separate statues from Archbishop Charles Antoine de La Roche-Aymon sanctioned by Pope Benedict XIV in 1754.
It was closed in 1793 like the other Irish Colleges in French-controlled areas, following the French Revolution, its property was sold by the French Government later in 1805 the remaining interests were transferred to the Irish College in Paris.

People associated with the Irish College Toulouse
 Bishop John O'Brien, entered Toulouse in 1725, Bachelor of Divinity in 1733.
 Rev. Dr. Thady O'Brien, ordained 1703 in Toulouse, Regius Professor of Theology, University of Toulouse and Rector of the Irish College Toulouse 1706-1715.
 Rev. Prof. Francis O'Hea, Superior (1751-1771) and Professor of Theology.
 Nicholas Madgett, adventurer, translator, licence and doctorat from Toulouse in 1764, ordained 1767, left priesthood following French Revolution.
 Bishop Francis Moylan, studied theology in the Irish College Toulouse.
 Bishop Charles Tuohy, studied in Toulouse, before moving to Paris, became Bishop of Limerick from 1814 to 1824

References

Former Catholic seminaries
1605 establishments in France
Irish diaspora in Europe
Irish Colleges on the Continent